Fred Rath may refer to:
Fred Rath Sr. (born 1943), Major League Baseball pitcher for the Chicago White Sox
Fred Rath Jr. (born 1973), son of the above, Major League Baseball pitcher for the Colorado Rockies
Fred J. Rath (1888–1968), American businessman and politician from New York
Fred Rath (writer) (1874–1954), American writer